T-Engine Forum is a non-profit organization which develops an open standard for real time embedded system development and to develop ubiquitous computing environment. They develop open specifications for ITRON, T-Kernel and ubiquitous ID architecture. The chair of T-Engine Forum is Dr. Ken Sakamura.

History
In 1984 TRON Project was started by Prof. Dr. Ken Sakamura of the University of Tokyo. The project's goal was to design an open RTOS kernel. The TRON framework defines a complete architecture for the different computing units. ITRON became the most popular TRON architecture. ITRON specification promotion was done by the various companies which sell the commercial implementations. In 2002, T-Engine forum was formed to provide an open source RTOS implementation based on ITRON specification known as T-Kernel. The TRON Project was integrated into T-Engine Forum in 2010. Its activities have been taken over and continued by T-Engine.

Organisation
As of July, 2011 there are 266 members in T-Engine forum. Executive committee members includes Japanese companies like Fujitsu, Hitachi, NTT DoCoMo and Denso. A-level members who are involved in design and development of specifications for T-Engine and T-Kernel, or of Ubiquitous ID technology includes companies likes NEC and Yamaha Corporation. B-level members who are involved in development of product using T-Engine specification and T-Kernel includes companies like ARM, Freescale, MIPS Technologies, Mitsubishi, Robert Bosch GmbH, Sony Corporation, Toshiba and Xilinx. The supporting members and academic members involved with the forum includes many universities like University of Tokyo, Japan and Dalian Maritime University, China.

See also
TRON Project	
ITRON	
T-Kernel

References

External links 
 , TRON
 The Most Popular Operating System in the World
 Ken Sakamura
 ITRON Project Archive
 Introducing the μT-Kernel
 Information about T-Engine, T-Kernel and μT-Kernel Programming

TRON project
Standards organizations in Japan
Science and technology in Japan